OpenDor Media, formerly Jerusalem U, is a non-profit organization dedicated to film-based Jewish and Israel education. OpenDor Media produces feature-length films, short videos, social media content and educational resources.

OpenDor Media’s content is distributed via the internet, social media, television, grassroots campaigns, live events and educational partnerships. Since its founding in 2009, OpenDor Media has partnered with approximately 1800 organizations, schools, camps, and campus groups including Jewish Federation chapters, Jewish Community Relations Councils, Jewish National Fund, Hillel chapters and others.

Unpacked 
Unpacked is a brand created by OpenDor Media for young people to address issues related to Israel and Judaism. Publishing on YouTube, Instagram, Facebook and TikTok, it features videos and podcasts on Jewish and Israeli history, antisemitism, and the Holocaust, explainers on a variety of topics.

Unpacked for Educators is a website that features content created by Unpacked packaged for educators along with resources and materials. It runs a collaborative program for educators to network, develop skills, and gather material. OpenDor Media conducted a study in 2020 to research the impact that videos and social media have on Jewish education.

Films 

OpenDor Media has produced multiple critically acclaimed feature documentary films, Israel Inside: How a Small Nation Makes a Big Difference and Crossing the Line: The Intifada Comes to Campus. Israel Inside was seen by millions of people on PBS, Comcast on Demand, El Al flights and screened more than 400 times in 28 countries.

 Israel Inside: How a Small Nation Makes a Big Difference is a 55-minute, feature-length documentary that explores the positive characteristics of Israeli society from a humanistic, psychological, and emotional perspective. The film was released in 2011 and is narrated by former Harvard professor of Positive Psychology, Dr. Tal Ben-Shahar.
 Beneath the Helmet: From High School to the Home Front is a 2014 documentary film which explores the personal experiences of five Israeli high school graduates who are recruited to serve in the army paratrooper brigade for their compulsory military service.  Beneath the Helmet was named the 5th Best Military Documentary on Netflix Streaming in 2015.  It has been screened over 850 times.
 Crossing the Line: The Intifada Comes to Campus explores the phenomenon of anti-Israel and anti-Semitic activism on college campuses across North America. The documentary also examines the experiences of Jewish college students who are involved supporting the State of Israel and fighting against misinformation campaigns. Versions of the film have been made both for the United States and the United Kingdom. A follow-up documentary, produced in 2015, has been released by Jerusalem U called Crossing the Line 2: The New Face of Anti-Semitism on Campus. The film documents how a growing number of anti-Israel demonstrations on U.S. campuses also include anti-Semitic messaging.
 Hummus! The Movie is a documentary released in 2015 following three chefs in Israel who make hummus: a religious Jewish man, a Christian Arab man and a Muslim Arab woman. It won best movie presenting modern Jewish life and culture, at Jewish Motifs International Film Festival in Warsaw, Poland in 2017. 
 Mekonen: The Journey of an African Jew tells the story of Mekonen Abebe who was born and raised in rural Ethiopia and later became a commander in the Israeli Defense Forces. He was previous featured in Beneath the Helmet.
 Sustainable Nation discusses sustainable water solutions developed in Israel and shared with other countries.
 Exodus 91 tells the story of Asher Naim who was instrumental in Operation Solomon which airlifted Jewish Ethiopians to Israel in 1991.
 Unsafe Space explores Jewish identity on college campuses and profiles a diverse group of students from various universities.

History 

Imagination Productions, Inc., which operates under OpenDor Media (formerly JerusalemU), is a US registered 501(c)(3) nonprofit organization.  Founded in 2007, they have offices in Jerusalem, New York and Philadelphia. The organization is headed by founder and Executive Chairman Raphael Shore, CEO Andrew Savage, and EVP Noam Weissman. Former leadership includes president, Amy Holtz and Executive Vice President Eli Ovits.

Founder Raphael Shore, studied film at the University of Toronto. Shore produced the critically acclaimed PBS film, Israel Inside: How a Small Nation Makes a Big Difference, the 2010 documentary Crossing the Line: The Intifada Comes to Campus,  and Beneath the Helmet: From High School to the Home Front.

As Jerusalem U, OpenDor Media produced five film mini-series: Israel Inside/Out, Habits of Happiness: Positive Psychology & Judaism, Judaism 101, Cinema: The Jewish Lens and The Israel Course. They also created JU Max, which was a ten-week interactive, online course for college students.

References

External links 
 
 Unpacked website  
 Unpacked for Educators

Film production companies of the United States
Jewish media